Egil Sætren (May 11, 1894 –  June 18, 1964) was a Norwegian film set designer and actor.  He debuted as an actor and set designer in the 1921 film Jomfru Trofast.

Filmography

As set designer
1921: Jomfru Trofast
1921: Felix
1923: Strandhugg paa Kavringen
1925: Himmeluret
1932: Fantegutten
1933: Jeppe på bjerget
1934: Sangen om Rondane

As actor
1921: Jomfru Trofast
1932: Fantegutten

References

External links
 
 Egil Sætren at the Swedish Film Database

Set designers
Norwegian male film actors
Norwegian male silent film actors
20th-century Norwegian male actors
1894 births
1964 deaths